Chapit may refer to:

Chapit-e Olya
Chapit-e Sofla